Pal Pal Dil Ke Paas is a 2019 Indian Hindi-language Romance film written and directed by Sunny Deol and produced by Sunny Sounds Pvt Ltd and Zee Studios. This was Deol's third movie as director after Dillagi and Ghayal Once Again. The film was released on 20 September 2019.

Principal photography began on 21 May 2017. Dharmendra's Grandson Karan Deol  and Sahher Bambba were cast for the lead roles. Over 400 girls were auditioned for Sahher's role.

With a box office revenue of 10 crore against a 30 crore budget, the film was commercially unsuccessful.

Plot
Saher Sethi, a vlogger from Delhi, goes to Manali to review a solo trekking trip organized by Camp Ujhi Dhaar, run by Karan Sehgal. She thinks that the costly solo trip is a scam, and she would expose the camp's owner. Although they start on a bitter note, things began to improve between them during their journey, leading to Karan falling for her. He doesn't confess his feelings but tells her that he is afraid of attachment. Saher admits that she wanted to become a singer but couldn't follow her passion as Viren, her boyfriend, made fun of her at an open mic. He takes Saher to his childhood spot, where he sees a snow leopard, and remembers his mother, who died in an avalanche when she tried to capture a snow leopard on her camera. The trip finally comes to an end, Karan drops Saher at the airport, and both bid farewell to each other.

On reaching Delhi, Saher realizes that she has fallen in love with Karan and breaks up with Viren. She informs Karan that she is performing again at an open mic and indirectly asks him to come to Delhi. Karan unexpectedly shows up at the Open Mic, and they both confess their love for each other and share a kiss. The next day, at Saher's house party, Karan is introduced to Saher's family members and meets Viren, who invites Karan to his party the next day. Seeing Saher and Karan close and happy with each other, Viren feels devastated and becomes angry and pledges that he will do anything to be with Saher, whether right or wrong. The next Day, Saher's father talks to Karan in anger, and when Saher asks him, he replies that Viren told him everything. Saher speaks to Viren over the phone for lying to his parents, but he blackmails her about leaking her photos, which he took secretly on the Goa trip. Karan goes to Viren, and when Viren abuses Saher and Karan's mother, he thrashes him. Feeling insulted, Saher posts a video online of being eve-teased by Viren, who gets to know about this, goes to Saher's house and gets involved in a fight with her. The fight leads to Saher falling off the first floor. With Saher now in an unconscious condition, Viren's parents use political power to turn the case against Saher and beat up Karan.

Seeing Saher's condition deteriorate and her family suffering all the disrespect, Karan goes to Viren's house, beats him up, drags him to the hospital, and tells him to apologize to Saher. When he refuses, Karan chokes him, almost killing him, but Viren's mother asks him to leave him, and she apologizes to everyone.

Saher soon recovers from the accident, and in the end credits, Karan and Saher are shown as a happily married couple.

Filming
The film was mostly shot at various locations in the Pir Panjal Mountain Range covering Spiti Valley, Kunzum La, Rohtang La, Tabo, Chandra Taal, Kaza, Lahaul Valley and Manali region in Himachal Pradesh; while a substantial part was shot at locations in New Delhi, including a racing car sequence at Buddh International Circuit in NCR.

Cast
 Karan Deol as Karan Sehgal, Saher's husband
 Sahher Bambba as Saher Sehgal (Nee' Sethi), Karan's wife & Viren's ex-girlfriend
 Simone Singh as Vandana Sethi (Saher's mother)
 Sachin Khedekar as Ajay Sethi (Saher's father)
 Kallirroi Tziafeta as Karan's mother
 Aakash Ahuja as Viren Narang, Saher's ex-boyfriend and the main antagonist
 Kamini Khanna as Saher's grandmother
 Meghna Malik as Central minister Ratna Narang, Viren's mother
 Arsh Wahi as Rohan Verma
 Rishi Singh as Saher's uncle 
 Bhavna Aneja as Anuradha, Saher's aunt
 Ravi Dudeja as Natasha's Father
 Madhu Khandari as Natasha's Mother 
 Ritika Thakur as Aditi Thakur (Karan's best friend)
 Akash Dhar as MP Sushant Narang, Viren's brother 
 Nupur Nagpal as Natasha Sabharwal, Saher's childhood friend
 Kapil Negi as Vikram Thakur (Karan's mentor and Aditi's father)
 Suhani Sethi as Saachi Sethi (Saher's sister)
 Vijayant Kohli as Kapil Kumar Gupta
 Rahul Singh as Sachin 
 Mannu Sandhu as Sushant's wife
 Pooja Katyal as Pooja, Viren's friend
 Diksha Bahl as Vaishali
 Reuben Israel as Viren's father

Soundtrack 

The music of the film is composed by Sachet–Parampara and Tanishk Bagchi (noted) while lyrics are by Siddharth-Garima.

Reception 
The film mostly received mixed to negative reviews.

Monika Rawal Kukreja writing for Hindustan Times noted that the film had done justice to its genre and praised Karan Deol and Sahher Bambba for their onscreen freshness. Also praising cinematography and music, she criticised the writing for lacking punch dialogues and effective humour. Concluding she opined, "Pal Pal Dil Ke Paas is definitely one of your run-of-the-mill love stories, but it makes you smile, cry, laugh and brings a sense of freshness."

Gaurang Chauhan of Times Now rated it 2.5 stars out of 5, stated that "Pal Pal Dil Ke Paas is a visually stunning film with some good tunes but the movie somehow misses the mark due to its overlong length and a mediocre screenplay. Sahher Bambba impresses".

Parina Taneja of India TV gave 2 stars out of 5 and opined, that it was a love story that failed to leave the audience with lingering moments. Agreeing with Chauhan, Taneja
praised the performance of Bambba, direction and cinematography. Criticising screenplay and pace of the film she noted that music though melodious didn't add value to the film. Concluding, she wrote, "Pal Pal Dil Ke Paas is a one time watch only if you really want to enjoy the breathtaking visuals of Himachal Pradesh.

Further NDTV rated the movie 1 out of 5 and wrote "Pal Pal Dil Ke Paas lacks the freshness that one would expect from a film with a new romantic pair. The reason is obvious: the plot is as old, but not as sturdy, as the hills."

Box office
The film performed poorly at the box office, collecting 10.03 crore against a 30 crore budget. Pal Pal Dil Ke Paas collected 1.15 crore on the opening day with a total opening weekend collection of  4.15 crore.

References

External links

Films scored by Sachet–Parampara
Films scored by Tanishk Bagchi
Indian romantic drama films
Films set in Manali, Himachal Pradesh
2010s Hindi-language films
2019 films
2019 romantic drama films